Litke Deep is an oceanic trench in the Arctic Ocean.

The deepest point in Litke Deep is the closest point on the Earth's surface to the Earth's center given that it is located along the planet's polar flattening. Based on average global sea level (mean sea level), the deepest point in Litke Deep is shallower than Challenger Deep. Litke Deep is 2nd deepest point in Arctic Ocean after Molloy Deep.

Topography

Location
The Litke Deep is located in the southwestern part of the Eurasian Basin, which stretches from northeastern part of Greenland past the Svalbard archipelago, Franz Josef Land and Severnaya Zemlya to the Taymyr Peninsula. It is situated south of the underwater ridge Gakkel Ridge roughly 350 kilometers northeast of Svalbard and roughly 220 km north of the island of Nordaustlandet. The deepest part is at 5,449 metres (17,881 feet) under sea level.

Closest point to Earth's center

The Challenger Deep is lower below sea level, but the Litke Deep is reported to be the closest point on the surface to Earth's center, with Molloy Deep a very close second.

The seabed at Litke Deep is the fixed point on Earth that has the least distance from the center – because of the oblate spheroid shape of the planet Earth, which is flatter at poles and thicker at the equator. Application of the formula at Earth radius shows that the Earth's radius is  lesser at Litke Deep than at Challenger Deep.

Litke Deep is closer to North pole at 82°24’ N and the difference between Earth's diameter at poles and equator is greater than the depth at Challenger Deep ( below sea level), around 11°22' north, nearer to equator with sea level also having the difference. In this ranking, several other Arctic as well as Antarctic depths such as Molloy Deep, seabed at North Pole, Factorian Deep and Meteor Deep in Southern Ocean exceed Challenger Deep. However, by depth below sea level, Litke Deep is not the deepest point in the Arctic Ocean.

Surveys
The Litke Deep was located in 1955 by the Russian icebreaker Fyodor Litke expedition. It is named after Russian explorer Fyodor Petrovich Litke.

Descents
No crewed or unmanned descents have been undertaken to Litke Deep as of 2022.

See also
 List of oceanic trenches

References

External links
 Sketch of the area
 Russian language map of the area

Extreme points of Earth
Lowest points of the World Ocean
Oceanic trenches of the Arctic Ocean
Oceanic basins of the Arctic Ocean
Geography of the Arctic